Skin Yard was an American grunge band from Seattle, Washington, who were active from 1985 to 1992.

History

Career
The band was formed in January 1985 by Daniel House and Jack Endino, who were subsequently joined by Ben McMillan and Matt Cameron. Skin Yard played its first official concert on June 7, 1985, opening for the U-Men.

Legacy
In 2017, Metal Injection ranked Skin Yard at number 8 on their list of "10 Heaviest Grunge Bands".

Band members
Original lineup
 Ben McMillan – vocals (1985–1992, died 2008)
 Jack Endino – guitar (1985–1992)
 Daniel House – bass (1985–1991)
 Matt Cameron – drums (1985–1986)

Later members
 Steve Wied – drums (1986)
 Greg Gilmore – drums (1986)
 Jason Finn – drums (1986–1987)
 Scott McCullum – drums (1987–1989)
 Barrett Martin – drums (1990–1992)
 Pat Pedersen – bass (1991–1992)

Discography

Studio albums

Singles/EPs

Compilation appearances
 1985 – "Throb" and "The Birds" on Deep Six
 1988 - "American Nightmare" on Secretions
 1990 – "Snowblind" on Hard to Believe: Kiss Covers Compilation
 1991 – "Machine Gun Etiquette" on Another Damned Seattle Compilation

References

Further reading

External links
 

American grunge groups
Musical groups from Seattle
C/Z Records artists
Musical groups established in 1985
Musical groups disestablished in 1992
1985 establishments in Washington (state)